A cortical lobule (or renal lobule) is a part of a renal lobe. It consists of the nephrons grouped around a single medullary ray, and draining into a single collecting duct. Its near identical parallel is the rectal lobe, which is present in the majority of mammals.

References

External links
 

Kidney anatomy